is a village located in Yoshino District, Nara Prefecture, Japan.

As of March 2017, the village has an estimated population of 1,498 and a density of 5.6 persons per km2. The total area is 269.26 km2.

History
Between 1991 and 2016, no families in Sogio district had a birth.

Sister City

Education

The village has an elementary school, Kawakami Elementary School (川上村立川上小学校), and a junior high school, Kawakami Junior High School (川上村立川上中学校).

Notable people from Kawakami
Daimanazuru Kenji, former sumo wrestler

References

External links

 Kawakami official website 

Villages in Nara Prefecture